Chair de poule (French for "goosebumps") is a 1963 French crime film directed by Julien Duvivier and starring Robert Hossein, Catherine Rouvel, Jean Sorel and Georges Wilson. The screenplay is based on the 1960 novel Come Easy, Go Easy by James Hadley Chase, which took several plot elements from the 1934 novel The Postman Always Rings Twice by James M Cain. The film was released in the United States as Highway Pickup.

Plot
In Paris, Daniel and Paul work installing safes by day and robbing them by night. When a raid goes wrong and a man is killed, Daniel is shot down by the police and jailed. He escapes and, heading south, is given a job and a room by Thomas, who runs an isolated café and garage with his much younger wife Maria. She scorns the drifter her husband has hired until, by chance, she sees an old newspaper that reports his escape. She tells Daniel she will turn him in unless he opens the safe where Thomas keeps his cash.

When Thomas is out one night, Daniel starts work; but Thomas returns early and after an argument Maria shoots him dead. Once Daniel has buried the body, the two try to run the place as before, except that they now share a bed. After Daniel rings Paris to tell Paul where he is, Paul joins them and Maria switches her attentions to him, thinking he will be easier to deal with if he opens the safe that Daniel refuses to touch again. Intruders then wound Daniel so that he is immobilised and, while Maria is out, Paul opens the safe. But she returns early and after an argument he shoots her dead. Leaving Daniel to his fate, he is making off with the money when he is caught at a police roadblock and shot dead.

Cast
 Robert Hossein as Daniel Boisset 
 Catherine Rouvel as Maria 
 Jean Sorel as Paul Genest 
 Georges Wilson as Thomas
 Lucien Raimbourg as Roux 
 Nicole Berger as Simone 
 Jacques Bertrand as Marc 
 Jean-Jacques Delbo as Joubert 
 Sophie Grimaldi as Starlet
 Armand Mestral as Corenne 
 Jean Lefebvre as Priest
 Robert Dalban as Brigadier

External links
 
 
  Chair de poule at “Cinema-francais“ (French)

1963 films
1963 crime films
French black-and-white films
Films based on works by James Hadley Chase
Films set in Paris
French crime films
Films directed by Julien Duvivier
1960s French-language films
Films scored by Georges Delerue
Films based on British novels
Films with screenplays by René Barjavel
1960s French films